The Sinner and the Saint: Dostoevsky, a Crime and Its Punishment is a book by Kevin Birmingham. It details events in the life of Fyodor Dostoevsky and the inspiration behind his acclaimed novel, Crime and Punishment.

According to Birmingham, the protagonist Rodion Raskolnikov was partly based on a minor French poet turned murderer, Pierre François Lacenaire.

The Sinner and the Saint is the second book authored by Birmingham. His first, The Most Dangerous Book: The Battle for James Joyce’s Ulysses, originally published in 2014, won the PEN New England Award in 2015 and Truman Capote Award for Literary Criticism in 2016.

References

2021 non-fiction books
Works about Fyodor Dostoyevsky
Allen Lane (imprint) books